The Sŏch'ang Line is an electrified railway line of the Korean State Railway in Tŏkch'ŏn-si, South P'yŏngan Province, North Korea, running from Tŏkch'ŏn on the P'yŏngdŏk Line to Sŏch'ang. It connects to the Sinsŏng Line at West Tŏkch'ŏn, whilst the Hoedun Line and the Hyŏngbong Line connect at Ch'ŏlgisan.

Services

Local passenger trains 723/724 operate between Tŏkch'ŏn on the P'yŏngdŏk Line and  Hyŏngbong on the Hyŏngbong Line via Sŏch'ang Line, stopping at West Tŏkch'ŏn and Ch'ŏlgisan on this line.

Route 

A yellow background in the "Distance" box indicates that section of the line is not electrified.

References

Railway lines in North Korea
Standard gauge railways in North Korea